{{DISPLAYTITLE:C30H40O6}}
The molecular formula C30H40O6 (molar mass: 496.63 g/mol, exact mass: 496.2825 u) may refer to:

 Absinthin
 Lepidolide

Molecular formulas